Great Beach Hill is a mountain in Barnstable County, Massachusetts. Bound Brook Island is located north, Merrick Island is located north-northeast, Gross Hill is located northeast and Little Beach Hill is located southeast of Great Beach Hill.

References

Mountains of Massachusetts
Mountains of Barnstable County, Massachusetts